For the Winter Olympics, there are 23 venues that start with the letter 'L'.

References